Sants Estació is a station in the Barcelona Metro network in the Sants-Montjuïc district of Barcelona. It serves the Barcelona Sants railway station, Barcelona's principal main line railway station, and is named Sants Estació to distinguish it from the nearby Plaça de Sants station also named after the Sants neighbourhood. It is served by line L3 and line L5.

The line L3 section of the station is situated under Numància street, between Melcior Palau and Avinguda Josep Tarradellas. It has a hall at each side of the station. To access to the railway station it is necessary to go through line 5 hall.

The line L5 section of the station was opened in 1969 with the opening of the line between Collblanc and Diagonal. The metro station is situated on the north part of the railway station, between Guitard and Enric Bargés streets. The station is complex but has an own hall on the west side which has two direct accesses to the railway station. On the other side of the station there is the corridor to connect with line 3.

Sants Estació is one of three stations where lines L3 and L5 connect, the others being Diagonal and Vall d'Hebron metro stations. Like both these two stations, the platforms of the two lines at Sants Estació are connected by an underground passageway. However, unlike the other two, there is also a single track connection between the two lines at Sants Estació.

The line L5 station was opened in 1969 with the opening of the line between Collblanc and Diagonal, whilst the line L3 station followed in 1975 with the opening of the line from this station to Zona Universitària. A second access hall to the L3 station was added in 2004.

Gallery

References

External links

Barcelona Metro line 3 stations
Barcelona Metro line 5 stations
Railway stations in Spain opened in 1969
Railway stations in Spain opened in 1975
Transport in Eixample
1975 establishments in Spain